Edward Theodore Bartlett (June 14, 1841 – May 3, 1910) was an American lawyer and politician from New York.

Biography
He was born on June 14, 1841, in Skaneateles, New York to Levi Bartlett. His father moved in 1831 from Haverhill, New Hampshire, to Skaneateles, New York, and practiced medicine there.

He was admitted to the New York Bar Association in 1862, and practiced law in Syracuse, New York. He moved to New York City in 1868.

In 1891, he ran for the New York Supreme Court but was defeated. In 1893, he was elected on the Republican ticket to the New York Court of Appeals. He was re-elected in 1907, and died in office.

He died of heart disease at the Albany Hospital in Albany, New York on May 3, 1910.

References

External links
Court of Appeals judges at New York Court History
CANDIDATES OF THE PARTIES in NYT on November 5, 1893
 Political Graveyard

1841 births
1910 deaths
People from Skaneateles, New York
Lawyers from Syracuse, New York
Politicians from New York City
Judges of the New York Court of Appeals
New York (state) Republicans
Lawyers from New York City
Politicians from Syracuse, New York
19th-century American judges
19th-century American lawyers